Ithystenus is a genus of  straight-snouted weevils belonging to the family Brentidae. Species of this genus can be found in Papua New Guinea

List of species

References 

 Biolib
 Zipcodezoo
 Global Names
 Synopsis of the described coleoptera of the world
 Alessandra Sforzi  The Straight-snouted Weevils (Coleoptera: Curculionoidea, Brentidae) of Papua Indonesia

Brentidae
Taxa named by Francis Polkinghorne Pascoe